Atherton is an incorporated town in San Mateo County, California, United States. Its population was 7,188 as of 2020.

The town’s zoning regulations permit only one single-family home per acre, and prohibit sidewalks. The majority of its inhabitants have strongly opposed changing these regulations to permit the construction of more densely packed housing. Some have suggested that this opposition is motivated by a desire to maintain the current ethnic proportions of the city, rather than by a desire to maintain the spacious quality that a relatively thinly spread population creates.

The locality engaged in multi-year lawsuits that have delayed the electrification of Caltrain, which serves cities in the San Francisco Peninsula and Silicon Valley.

Atherton is known for its wealth; in 1990 and 2019, Atherton was ranked as having the highest per capita income among U.S. towns that have with a population between 2,500 and 9,999, and the area covered by its zip code is regularly ranked as having the highest cost of living in the United States.  

About 73% of the city’s inhabitants are ethnically non-Hispanic white; this makes it among the least ethnically diverse cities in Silicon Valley.

History 
The entire area was originally part of the Rancho de las Pulgas. 

During the 1860s, Atherton was known as Fair Oaks. In 1923, it was decided to rename the town in honor of  Faxon Dean Atherton, a former 19th century landowner on the south peninsula.

Lawsuit against the electrification of Caltrain 
The town has been involved in lawsuits to block or delay the introduction of high-speed rail in California. Atherton was an early and vocal opponent of the electrification of the U.S. commuter railroad Caltrain, which serves cities in the San Francisco Peninsula and Silicon Valley. Residents opposed electrification and the proposed high-speed rail route because the overhead electrical lines would require tree removal and the town could potentially be divided by the closing of the two grade crossings at Fair Oaks Lane and Watkins Avenue.

In February 2015, shortly after the project received environmental clearance from the state, Atherton sued Caltrain, alleging the agency's environmental impact review was inadequate and that its collaboration with the CHSRA should be further vetted. In July 2015, the suit proceeded after Caltrain's request to the Surface Transportation Board to exempt it from California Environmental Quality Act (CEQA) guidelines was denied. Atherton reiterated its opposition to electrification on the basis that overhead wires would require removing a significant number of heritage trees, and city representatives asserted that "newer, cleaner, more efficient diesel trains" should supplant plans for "century-old catenary electrical line technology". Atherton mayor Rick De Golia was quoted as saying "Caltrain is locked into an old technology and 20th century thinking". After Caltrain issued infrastructure and rolling stock contracts in July 2016, Atherton representatives did not file a temporary restraining order to halt those contracts, preferring to let the suit proceed to a hearing. In September 2016, Contra Costa County Superior Court Judge Barry Goode sided with Caltrain, ruling that the electrification project did not hinge on the high-speed rail project's success, and was thus independent from the latter.

Atherton sued CHSRA again in December 2016, stating that using bond money intended for high-speed rail for CalMod was a material change in usage and therefore was unconstitutional because such a change would require voter approval first. In response, the California Legislature allowed the funding to be redirected by passing Assembly Bill No. 1889, which had been championed by Assemblymember Kevin Mullin in 2015. Mullin noted "this entire Caltrain corridor is the epicenter of the innovation economy and it's a job creation and economic engine. This electrification project, I would argue, is monumental with regard to dealing with [increased traffic and environmental impacts] effectively and efficiently."

The Caltrain station closed in 2020.

Land use and housing
Atherton is the wealthiest city in the United States. According to the San Francisco Chronicle, "the town’s ascendance stems largely from its single-family zoning, 1-acre-minimum lot sizes, flat land, streamlined permits and changing buyer demographics — which have translated into soaring house sizes and skyrocketing prices." There is no commercial zoning in the town, thus there are no restaurants, shops or grocery stores. There are no sidewalks in Atherton, only road lanes. 

Until 2022, the town’s zoning regulations permitted only one single-family home per acre and prohibit sidewalks. Partly as a result of these regulations, the average home price in the city in recent years was more than 7.5 million dollars. Many of the inhabitants have strongly opposed proposals to permit more housing construction. Among those include Golden State Warriors player Steph Curry. However, with the passage of SB 9 in 2022, the zoning regulations that limit how many units can be built on a property were nullified.

In 2022, the town blocked a proposal to build 131 multifamily housing units in the town in response to strong criticism of the proposal by the city’s inhabitants. Advocates for the construction of additional have criticized Atherton as being a NIMBY town. In 2022, California Governor Gavin Newsom singled out Atherton in a speech for its restrictive housing policies. The mayor said in 2022 that they were focusing on building affordable housing for staff and teachers at the city’s eight schools.

In February 2023, the Atherton City Council approved a housing plan with 348 mixed-income housing units. Under California law, the units must be built over the next eight years, and the city must reserve 148 units for occupancy by as "very low income" or "low income" individuals, 56 units for “moderate income” individuals, and 144 units for “above moderate income” individuals.

As of November 2022, Atherton's stated land-use goal is to “preserve the Town's character as a scenic, rural, thickly wooded residential area with abundant open space."

Geography

The town is considered to be part of the San Francisco metropolitan area.

Demographics

2000
At the 2000 census there were 7,194 people in 2,413 households, including 1,984 families, in the town.
Of the 2,413 households, 33.3% had children under the age of 18 living with them, 75.6% were married couples living together, 4.5% had a female householder with no husband present, and 17.8% were non-families. 12.8% of households were one person and 7.5% were one person aged 65 or older. The average household size was 2.85 and the average family size was 3.06.

The age distribution was: 23.7% under the age of 18, 7.2% from 18 to 24, 18.7% from 25 to 44, 30.3% from 45 to 64, and 20.2% 65 or older. The median age was 45 years. For every 100 females, there were 93.6 males. For every 100 women age 18 and over, there were 90.2 men.

The median income for a household in the town was in excess of $200,000, as was the median family income. Males had a median income of over $100,000 versus $68,393 for females. The per capita income for the town was $112,408. About 0.8% of families and 1.7% of the population were below the poverty line, including 0.6% of those under age 18 and 3.3% of those age 65 or over.

2010
At the 2010 census Atherton had a population of 6,914. The racial makeup of Atherton was 5,565 (80.5%) White, 75 (1.1%) African American, 7 (0.1%) Native American, 911 (13.2%) Asian, 45 (0.7%) Pacific Islander, 95 (1.4%) from other races, and 216 (3.1%) from two or more races. Hispanic or Latino of any race were 268 people (3.9%).

The census reported that 6,529 people (94.4% of the population) lived in households, 385 (5.6%) lived in non-institutionalized group quarters, and no one was institutionalized.

There were 2,330 households, 787 (33.8%) had children under the age of 18 living in them, 1,755 (75.3%) were opposite-sex married couples living together, 109 (4.7%) had a female householder with no husband present, 48 (2.1%) had a male householder with no wife present. There were 34 (1.5%) unmarried opposite-sex partnerships, and 15 (0.6%) same-sex married couples or partnerships. 321 households (13.8%) were one person and 178 (7.6%) had someone living alone who was 65 or older. The average household size was 2.80. There were 1,912 families (82.1% of households); the average family size was 3.03.

The age distribution was 1,543 people (22.3%) under the age of 18, 579 people (8.4%) aged 18 to 24, 966 people (14.0%) aged 25 to 44, 2,264 people (32.7%) aged 45 to 64, and 1,562 people (22.6%) who were 65 or older. The median age was 48.2 years. For every 100 females, there were 96.6 males. For every 100 women age 18 and over, there were 95.3 men.

The median household income was in excess of $250,000, the highest of any place in the United States. The per capita income for the town was $128,816. About 2.9% of families and 5.1% of the population were below the poverty line, including 5.6% of those under age 18 and 5.4% of those age 65 or over.

There were 2,530 housing units at an average density of 501.1 per square mile, of the occupied units 2,116 (90.8%) were owner-occupied and 214 (9.2%) were rented. The homeowner vacancy rate was 1.6%; the rental vacancy rate was 3.9%. 5,921 people (85.6% of the population) lived in owner-occupied housing units and 608 people (8.8%) lived in rental housing units.

Forbes ranked Atherton as second on its list of America's Most Expensive ZIP Codes in 2010, listing median house price as over $2,000,000.

2020
At the 2020 census Atherton had a population of 7,193 and 2,252 households, the homeowner vacancy rate was 0%.

There was an average 2.94 people per household, 89.2% of homes were owner occupied and 10.8% were renter occupied. The racial makeup of Atherton was 5,403 (75%) White, 1,655 (23%) Asian, 124 (1.7%) African American, 18 (0.3%)  Native American, 107 (1.5%) Pacific Islander, 3.2% from two or more races. Hispanic or Latino of any race were 540 (7.5%) people. The median age was 49. For every 100 females there were 100.1 men. 

The age distribution was 1,472 people (20.5%) under the age of 18, 862 people (5.6%) aged aged 18 to 24, 932 people (12.9%) aged 25 to 44, 2,123 (29.5%) aged 45-64 and 1,813 people (25.2%) over the age of 65. 

Median income for a household was over $250,000. Males had a median income $102,192 versus $53,882 for females.  About 1.1% of families and 2.6% of the population were below the poverty line, including 0.5% of those under the age of 18 and 1.1% of those 65 years or over.  

Property Shark ranked first Atherton for the fourth year in a row as the most expensive ZIP code in the United States in 2022 with the median home price at $7,900,000.

Arts and culture 
There are a number of active community organizations: the Atherton Heritage Association, the Atherton Arts Committee, the Atherton Tree Committee, the Friends of the Atherton Community Library, the Holbrook-Palmer Park Foundation, the Atherton Dames, the Police Task Force, and the Atherton Civic Interest League. There are also home owners' associations in various neighborhoods. The Menlo Circus Club is a private club with tennis, swimming, stables and a riding ring located within the town.

There are also several tracts of contemporary Eichler homes, most notably in the Lindenwood neighborhood in the northeast part of the town.

The Holbrook-Palmer Estate, was once an active rural estate and gentleman's farm.

The city is served by the Atherton Public Library of the San Mateo County Libraries, a member of the Peninsula Library System.

Government 

Political Party Registration
According to the California Secretary of State, as of March 11, 2022, Atherton has 5,063 registered voters. Of those, 2,192 (43.2%) are registered Democrats, 1,247 (24.6%) are registered Republicans and 1,317 (26%) have declined to state a political party.

Education 
Among Atherton's public schools, Encinal, Las Lomitas, and Laurel are elementary schools, while Selby Lane is both an elementary and a middle school. Menlo-Atherton is a high school. Atherton does not have its own public school system. Selby Lane is part of the Redwood City School District, the high school is part of the Sequoia Union High School District, Las Lomitas Elementary School is part of the Las Lomitas Elementary School District, and both Encinal and Laurel are part of the Menlo Park City School District.

Among the town's private schools, Sacred Heart is an elementary, middle and high school, and Menlo School is a middle and high school.

Menlo College is a private four-year college.

Notable people

 Paul Allen, late Microsoft co-founder.
 Marc Andreessen, co-founder of Netscape and general partner at Andreessen Horowitz.
 Mohamed Atalla, Egyptian-American engineer, inventor of MOSFET transistor, founder of Atalla Corporation
 Gertrude Atherton, American author
 Faxon Atherton, namesake of Atherton, California 
 CiCi Bellis, tennis player
 Lindsey Buckingham, of Fleetwood Mac
 Nick Clegg, Meta Platforms executive and former Deputy Prime Minister of the United Kingdom, and his wife,  Miriam González Durántez, a lawyer
 Ty Cobb, Hall of Fame Major League Baseball player
 Stephen Curry and Ayesha Curry, NBA star and his family moved to Atherton when the Golden State Warriors moved to San Francisco in 2019.
 Timothy C. Draper, venture capitalist and founder of Draper Fisher Jurvetson
 Clay Dreslough, game designer, raised in Atherton
 Douglas Engelbart, computer engineer
 Drew Fuller, actor, known for role on Charmed and Army Wives
 Bill Gurley, venture capitalist; general partner at Benchmark.
 Elizabeth Holmes, former biotechnology entrepreneur convicted of fraud. 
 Ben Horowitz, co-founder of Andreessen Horowitz.
 Ron Johnson, former senior executive at Apple
 Guy Kawasaki, venture capitalist
 Bobbie Kelsey, Stanford University women's basketball assistant coach
 Andy Kessler, author of books on business, technology, and the health field
Jan Koum, co-founder of WhatsApp
 Charlie Kubal, music producer, created 2010's Mashup Album of the Year, the notorious xx, grew up in Atherton
 Douglas Leone (born 1957), billionaire venture capitalist
 Andy W. Mattes, CEO of Diebold.
 Willie Mays, Hall of Fame Major League Baseball player
 Rajeev Motwani, professor, computer science, Stanford University
 Farzad Nazem, former chief technology officer of Yahoo! and one of its longest-serving executives, now an angel investor
 Chamath Palihapitiya, CEO of Social Capital, and board member of the Golden State Warriors.
 J. B. Pritzker, Governor of Illinois and co-founder of the Pritzker Group
 Tom Proulx, co-founder of Intuit.
 Vivek Ranadive, chairman, CEO and founder of TIBCO Software
 Jerry Rice, Hall of Fame football player
 George R. Roberts, co-founder of Kohlberg Kravis Roberts.
 Ted Robinson, San Francisco 49ers play-by-play announcer
 Maureen Kennedy Salaman, author and proponent of alternative medicine
 Sheryl Sandberg, former chief operating officer of Meta Platforms.
 James R. Scapa, co-founder, chairman and CEO of Altair Engineering
 Eric Schmidt, former executive chairman and CEO of Google
 Charles R. Schwab, founder and CEO of the Charles Schwab Corporation
 Shirley Temple, child movie star and diplomat
 Y.A. Tittle, 49ers & Giants QB, NFL HOFer, resident until his death in 2017
 Bob Weir, of the Grateful Dead and Ratdog, raised in Atherton
 Steve Westly, former State Controller of California, major Democratic Party fundraiser, and venture capitalist.
 Meg Whitman, former president and CEO of Hewlett-Packard, former CEO of eBay
Dennis Woodside, president of Impossible Foods, former COO of Dropbox
Quadeca, YouTuber/Rapper grew up in Atherton

See also

References

External links

 

1923 establishments in California
Cities in San Mateo County, California
Cities in the San Francisco Bay Area
Incorporated cities and towns in California
Populated places established in 1923